Yiddish orthography is the writing system used for the Yiddish language. It includes Yiddish spelling rules and the Hebrew script, which is used as the basis of a full vocalic alphabet. Letters that are silent or represent glottal stops in the Hebrew language are used as vowels in Yiddish. Other letters that can serve as both vowels and consonants are either read as appropriate to the context in which they appear, or are differentiated by diacritical marks derived from Hebrew nikkud, commonly referred to as "nekudot" or "pintalach" (literally "points" as those marks are mostly point-like signs). Additional phonetic distinctions between letters that share the same base character are also indicated by either pointing or adjacent placement of otherwise silent base characters. Several Yiddish points are not commonly used in any latter-day Hebrew context; others are used in a manner that is specific to Yiddish orthography. There is significant variation in the way this is applied in literary practice. There are also several differing approaches to the disambiguation of characters that can be used as either vowels or consonants.

Words of Aramaic and Hebrew origin are normally written in the traditional orthography of the source language—i.e., the orthography of these words, which is consonant-based, is generally preserved (Niborski 2012). All other Yiddish words are represented with phonemic orthography. Both forms can appear in a single word-for example, where a Yiddish affix is applied to a Hebrew stem. Yiddish diacritics may also be applied to words that are otherwise written entirely with traditional orthography.

Reform and standardization
 

In the early 20th century, for cultural and political reasons, efforts were initiated toward the development of a uniform Yiddish orthography. A specimen initial practice was described in detail by the Yiddish lexicographer Alexander Harkavy in a Treatise on Yiddish Reading, Orthography, and Dialectal Variations first published in 1898 together with his Yiddish-English Dictionary (Harkavy 1898). Additional illustrations of this variation are provided in source excerpts in Fishman 1981, which also contains a number of texts specifically about the need (pro and con) for a uniform orthography. A detailed chronology of the major events during this normative action, including rosters of conference participants, bibliographic references to the documents they produced, and summaries of their contents, is given in Yiddish in Schaechter 1999. There is a less detailed (but extensive nonetheless) English language review of this process in Estraikh 1999.

The first action formally undertaken by a government was in the Soviet Union in 1920, abolishing the separate etymological orthography for words of Semitic (i.e., Hebrew and Aramaic) origin. This was extended twelve years later with the elimination of the five separate final-form consonants (as indicated in the table below) which were, however, widely reintroduced in 1961. The changes are both illustrated in the way the name of the author Sholem Aleichem is written. His own work uses the form  but in Soviet publication this is respelled phonetically to  also dispensing with the separate final-form mem and using the initial/medial form instead. This can be seen, together with a respelling of the name of the protagonist of his , by comparing the title pages of that work in the U.S. and Soviet editions illustrated next to this paragraph. The Germanized  in the former exemplifies another widespread trend, discussed further below.

The efforts preliminary to the 1920 reform, which took place in several countries — most notably in Poland with focus on a uniform school curriculum — resulted in other devices that were not implemented as a result of any governmental mandate. This led to the development of their   ( – "Rules of Yiddish Orthography"), also known as the "SYO" (Standard Yiddish Orthography) or the "YIVO Rules" (1st edition YIVO 1935, current edition SYO 1999). This has become the most frequently referenced such system in present-day use. Although it regularly figures in pedagogical contexts, it would be misleading to suggest that it is similarly dominant elsewhere. Other orthographies are frequently encountered in contemporary practice and are house standards for many publishers.

A useful review of this variation is provided in the Oxford University   ( – "Standard Rules of Yiddish Orthography") (Oxford 1992 and available online), written in and codifying a more conventional orthography than the one put forward by YIVO. Differences in the systems can be seen simply by comparing the titles of the two documents but they differ more fundamentally in their approaches to the prescription and description of orthographic detail. The former treats orthographic variation as a positive attribute of the Yiddish literature and describes essential elements of that variation. The latter presents a uniform Yiddish orthography, based on observed practice but with proactive prescriptive intent. Strong difference of opinion about the relative merit of the two approaches has been a prominent aspect of the discussion from the outset and shows little sign of abating. Although the Yiddish alphabet as stated in the SYO is widely accepted as a baseline reference (with a few minor but frequently encountered variations), the spelling and phonetics of the YIVO system of romanized transliteration discussed below, remain subjects of particular contention. The intent of the SYO is not to describe the spectrum of traditional orthographic practice. The bulk of Yiddish literature predates the formulation of those rules and the discrepancies are significant.

Transliteration
A few Yiddish letters and letter combinations are pronounced quite differently in the various Yiddish dialects. Whatever impact this may have on the discussion of standardized orthography, it becomes a significant factor when Yiddish is transliterated into other scripts. It is entirely possible to assign a specific character or sequence of characters in, for example, the Latin alphabet to a specific character or character sequence in the Yiddish alphabet. The transliterated form will, however, be pronounced in a manner that appears natural to the reader. A choice therefore needs to be made about which of the several possible pronunciations of the Yiddish word is to be conveyed prior to its transliteration, with parallel attention to the phonemic attributes of the target language.

The romanization of Yiddish has been a focus of scholarly attention in Europe since the early 16th century. A detailed review of the various systems presented through the 17th century, including extensive source excerpts, is provided in Frakes 2007. The Harkavy treatise cited above describes a late 19th-century system that is based on the pronunciation of the Northeastern Yiddish dialect, Litvish, for an anglophone audience. This was also a mainstay of the standardization efforts of YIVO, resulting in the romanization system described in detail below. The Harkavy and YIVO initiatives provide a convenient framework within which intervening developments may be considered. There was significant debate about many aspects of that sequence, including the need for any form of standardized orthography at all (Fishman 1981).

The outright replacement of Hebrew script with Roman script in the native representation of written Yiddish was briefly considered, among others by L. L. Zamenhof. This had no impact on mainstream orthography but a number of Yiddish books are currently available in romanized editions. These include Yiddish dictionaries, a context in which consistent and phonetically tenable transliteration is essential.

There is no general agreement regarding transliteration of Hebrew into the Roman alphabet. The Hebrew component of a Yiddish text will normally reflect the transliterator's preference without being seen as a component of the methodology applied to the romanization of words presented in the phonemic orthography.

Transcription
A transliteration system uses one script to represent another as closely as possible. It normally permits unambiguous conversion between the two scripts. Where the intent is to indicate phonetic variation, some form of transcription (frequently done through usage of the International Phonetic Alphabet (IPA)) will be required. There are also many contexts in which phonetic distinctions are indicated by the diacritical marking of the base characters, or through the similar use of some alternate script that is familiar to the intended audience. These approaches are all also seen in native Yiddish texts, where distinctions that cannot be directly represented with the basic Yiddish script but do need to be highlighted, are indicated by using additional Hebrew diacritical marks, with Roman letters, or with the IPA.

There is no intrinsic reason why a transcription scheme cannot also be used for transliteration. In general, however, there is no expectation that the representation of a word in the source script can be retrieved from a transcription. Its purpose is to indicate how a word is pronounced, not its native orthography.

The table in the following section indicates two alternatives each for romanized transliteration and phonetic transcription, and is keyed to the Yiddish character repertoire as codified by YIVO. Other transliteration systems are also regularly employed in a variety of contexts, but none represent the full range of variant pronunciation in Yiddish dialects. Nor is the YIVO system equally appropriate phonetically to all languages using Roman script. This issue becomes particularly complex when dealing with older texts where little is known about contemporaneous pronunciation; transmitting the fullest possible detail of their notation is historically important. There are several approaches to the romanization of such material. The YIVO transliteration system is solely intended to serve as an English-oriented phonetic counterpart to the modern Standard Yiddish described (and to some extent prescribed) in the SYO. That work does, however, consider the transcription of variant pronunciation as will be discussed below.

YIVO published a major study of the range of Yiddish phonetic variation in The Language and Cultural Atlas of Ashkenazic Jewry, commonly referred to as the LCAAJ. This uses a detailed system of marked Roman characters and suprasegmental marks to indicate that variation, and does not apply standard YIVO transliteration at all. Although the full phonetic transcription scheme is not amenable to presentation in the table below, its core elements have been included. This scheme has been used by later authors to indicate "phonetic transcription," and is labeled in that manner below. One recent example of this is provided in Jacobs 2005. Another transcription system frequently cited in academic contexts was devised and presented (in German) by Solomon Birnbaum in Birnbaum 1918 and was used in his later German works, as well as his English publication Birnbaum 1979. This was intended to provide extreme flexibility in the representation of differences between dialects but failed to gain further practical acceptance due to its intricacy and idiosyncratic appearance.:

The Yiddish alphabet
This table lists the Yiddish alphabet as described in the Uriel Weinreich English–Yiddish–English Dictionary (Weinreich 1968), with a few variants that may be seen in readily available literature. The YIVO romanizations are taken from the same source, where they are presented as "sound equivalents". The romanizations indicated in Harkavy 1898 are included for comparison. The IPA transcriptions correspond to the examples provided by YIVO (with a few additional variants). The transcriptions in the following column were extrapolated from the LCAAJ. The Dutch transliteration system was taken from the Jiddisch-Nederlands Woordenboek. It is important to note that the elements of the two transcription systems appear in this table as appropriate to the standard pronunciation discussed under the next heading. The same elements, particularly those indicating vowels and diphthongs, are associated with other Yiddish letters when other pronunciations are being transcribed.

The table also includes several digraphs and a trigraph that are standard elements of the Yiddish writing system. They appear here in normal alphabetic order but are commonly collated separately at the end of a listing of the basic single-character alphabet.

The pronunciation in contemporary Hasidic communities reflects the regional dialects from which these communities originate, and therefore may differ from the standard presented below.

The Standard Yiddish Orthography
The SYO is presented in Yiddish, and a few romanized transcriptions are included only where needed to indicate variant pronunciation. Given that the YIVO standardization initiative has been severely criticized for failing to accommodate such variation, it may be worth noting that the SYO explicitly references the three major branches of Eastern Yiddish — Litvish (Northern), Poylish (Central), and Ukrainish (Southern), as developed in the regions centered on present-day Lithuania/Belarus, Poland, and Ukraine/Moldova. The SYO gives dialect-specific romanized equivalents for the following characters:

A few further romanized equivalents are provided but do not indicate dialectal differences. These are identical to what is contained in the table in the preceding section, with the following exceptions:

YIVO took Litvish as the standard dialect with only slight modification, to a large extent because of the consistency with which its phonemic attributes could be represented by a standardized orthography similarly requiring only minimal elaboration of traditional practice. The important distinctions between Litvish, Poylish, and Ukrainish are therefore not indicated in either the SYO or Weinreich dictionary. These are, however, discussed in detail in the LCAAJ to which Uriel Weinreich was a major contributor. The Roman characters appearing in the SYO correspond to those used in the LCAAJ, and their marking according to Central European orthographic convention provides greater flexibility in notating dialectal distinction than does an English-oriented approach. Phonetic transcription is therefore common in linguistic discourse about Yiddish, often using a wide range of diacritical marks in clear contrast to the totally undecorated YIVO romanization.

The SYO listing of the Yiddish alphabet (which predates the Weinreich dictionary) explicitly states that the vowels with combining points, and the vov and yud digraphs, are not counted as separate letters, nor are the additional consonant digraphs and trigraphs listed at all:
The order of the letters in the alphabet is as follows, from right to left:

These are not counted as separate letters of the alphabet:

Common variation

There are several areas in which Yiddish orthographic practice varies. One of them is the extent to which pointing is used to avoid ambiguity in the way a word may be read. This ranges from unpointed text, through a small number of pointed characters, to the redundant use of the full system of Hebraic vowel pointing. Text being prepared for print generally uses a certain amount of pointing. In other contexts, however, there is an increasing tendency to forgo it entirely.

The most frugal application of pointing is the distinction of pey and fey by enclosing a dot in the former (further details below). Immediately beyond that is the differentiation of the komets alef from the unpointed form and then the further use of the pasekh alef. Where additional points are applied, there can be significant variation in their number and disposition and there are often internal inconsistencies in a single system. (The belief that this variation was an impediment to the recognition of Yiddish as a literary peer to the other major European languages was a primary driving force toward the development of orthographic norms.)

A detailed generalized description of the pointing of Yiddish text is given in Harkavy 1898 and the topic is also treated briefly in the SYO (which otherwise simply declares the prescribed characters). A more extensive character repertoire is presented and discussed in Birnbaum 1918.

Although consonants are basically represented in the same manner, the indication of vowels differs more widely. One noteworthy situation that does pertain to the representation of consonants is the indication of phonetic distinctions between each of the four character pairs beys/veys, kof/khof, pey/fey, and tof/sof.  The 'hard' (plosive) pronunciation of the first letter in each pair is unequivocally denoted by a dot (dagesh) in the middle of the letter. The 'soft' (fricative) pronunciation is similarly notated with a horizontal bar over the letter (rafe). Most orthographic systems usually only point one of the two characters in a pair but may be inconsistent from pair to pair in indicating the hard or soft alternative. Text that otherwise conforms to the SYO therefore frequently omits the rafe from fey, in harmonization with its unpointed final form, and makes the contrastive distinction from a pey solely with a dagesh in the latter. The similar avoidance of the rafe and preferential use of the dagesh is a common alternative for the contrastive distinction between beys and veys, although in Yiddish, because beys is used much more than veys, with veys limited to words of Semitic origin, the dagesh is avoided and rafe used instead.

The rafe is an attribute of earlier Yiddish orthographic tradition and the dagesh is an adaptation of what is more generally a Hebrew practice. This also applies to the alternatives for indicating the distinction between yud when used as a consonant or as a vowel. There is a related need for marking the boundary between a yud and tsvey yudn where they appear adjacent to each other and, again, in the corresponding situation with vov and tsvey vovn. A dot under a yud (khirik yud) and to the left of a vov (melupm vov) unambiguously indicates the vocalic form of those letters. Harkavy does not use these pointed forms in the main table above, being among the details codified in the early 20th century. In the traditional Yiddish orthographies where these letters are not pointed, the vowel is indicated by preceding it with a shtumer alef (reducing the use of which was a major focus of the normative efforts). Although only the former spelling is consistent with the SYO and appears in Uriel Weinreich's dictionary, he uses the unpointed alternative exclusively in his own "Say it in Yiddish", a phrase book that contains the word in a large number of "Where is...?" queries and was published when the rules had already been well established.

A further graphic example of this distinction is seen in the official announcement, on 14 November 1997, of a change in editorial policy for the prominent Yiddish periodical,  (forverts – "Yiddish Forward"). It was first during that year that they adopted the YIVO orthography. The previous editorial position overtly opposed any such change and the following is included in the explanation of the shift (quoted in full in Schaechter 1999, p. 109):

The appearance of three alternate spellings for the name of the Yiddish language in a statement intended to describe its orthographic standardization might not require any comment if it were not for the clear indication that the cardinal representation —  — was neither the older nor the newer editorial preference. Regardless of the intent of that statement, a word-initial yud is consonantal and an adjacent yud is vocalic in all Yiddish orthographic systems, as is the constraint on a word initial tsvey yudn diphthong. The spelling  also illustrates some of the dialectic breadth of the Yiddish language, the name of which is both written and pronounced with and without an initial consonant. It may also be useful to note that in earlier texts, a single vov in word-initial position was often used to indicate  (a reflex of the German use of v to denote ).

Finally, letters other than shtumer alef may be used as silent indications of syllable boundaries and in compound consonants, as well as for extending the length of an adjacent vowel. This became particularly common in deliberately Germanized orthographies dating from the late 19th century, collectively termed daytshmerish. Its most obvious further attributes are the heavy use of double consonants where traditional orthography uses single ones, and the gratuitous substitution of German vocabulary for established Yiddish words. The desire to reverse that trend was another of the reasons for the effort toward orthographic standardization.

Publishers of Yiddish newspapers have, however, been particularly conservative in their attitude toward that development and the preceding editorial statement in Forverts provides a useful capsule summary of the details about which opinions differed. Other current Yiddish newspapers and magazines retain the spelling  and many elements of daytshmerish. Extensive additional source material relevant to the stance of the daily press on orthographic reform is provided in Fishman 1981.

Editorial acceptance of varying orthographies is a general characteristic of Hasidic publication, and a single work written by multiple authors may differ in that regard from section to section depending on the preferences of the individual contributors or the typographic context. One example of the latter situation is the use of the pointed forms of alef only in specific instances where they are deemed necessary to avoid misreading. The online manifestation of such orthographic heterogeneity can readily be seen in the Yiddish Wikipedia. This is an expansive aspect of contemporary Yiddish publication and will require detailed accommodation in future codifications of orthographic practice.

Graphic innovation
Orthographic reform as considered here, embraces two distinct actions. The first is concerned with the way Yiddish words are spelled, as illustrated in the preceding section with the name of the language itself. The second relates to the graphic devices used to distinguish, for example, between א when representing what in English is an /a/ and when representing an /o/. The pointed אַ and אָ came into use for that purpose in the mid-18th century and were thus well established by the time the 20th century reforms were initiated, as were several other traditional Yiddish pointings. The most deeply entrenched of these was the distinction between פ fey and פּ pey. YIVO proposed the additional use of pointed letters that were not in the Yiddish (or Hebrew) fonts of the day. This is a frequently cited reason for the SYO being slow to gain acceptance, but regardless of any opinion about their utility, most of the graphic elements introduced in that manner are now readily available. (The SYO explicitly states that pointing to disambiguate vowels does not change the identity of the base character; a pointed alef, for example, is not a letter of its own.)

The first edition of the SYO was preceded by a collection of essays published by YIVO in 1930 entitled, "A Standard of Yiddish Spelling; Discussion No. 1" ( — , YIVO 1930). Neither the title of this work, nor its contents, were written using the conventions that YIVO was subsequently to put forward on its basis. The pivotal essay in the 1930 collection was written by Max Weinreich. His, "A Projected Uniform Yiddish Orthography" (Weinreich 1930), was not written with the pointing that was to be prescribed in the SYO and introduces a character that was entirely absent from the previous repertoire. It appears at numerous additional places in the text and in two other essays in the same collection but did not appear in any subsequent printed work. It was, however, included in the SYO as a recommendation for use in handwritten text, where it is also encountered.

Further orthographic variation is seen in other YIVO publications from the same period, also using markings that were not included in the SYO, but which did have typographic precedent (for example, אֵ to represent /e/).

Computerized text production

There are orthographic alternatives in the digital representation of Yiddish text that may not be visually apparent but are of crucial importance to computer applications that compare two sequences of characters to determine if they match exactly. Examples of this are database queries and spell checkers. Situations where differing representations of typographically similar characters can give unexpected or incorrect results are described below. This may prove a particular concern for Internet users as Yiddish is increasingly used in Internationalized Domain Names, and in Web and e-mail addresses.

Some mobile clients only provide limited support for typing pointed text, restricting the range of available characters for such things as instant messaging and other forms of spontaneous digital text. Even people who are skilled in using laptop or desktop keyboards for that purpose (which also requires some erudition) are subject to this constraint. This fuels the move toward unpointed text and is illustrated in the blog,  Yiddish with an alef. This is of particular note given the late acceptance of the SYO by its parent publication, The Jewish Daily Forward, discussed below.

Digraphs
There are two different ways in which each of the digraphs tsvey vovn, vov yud, and tsvey yudn can be typed on Yiddish and Hebrew keyboards (which are both commonly used for the production of Yiddish text). If the digraph appears on a single key, as is normal in a Yiddish keyboard layout, pressing that key will produce a single-character ligature. In the Unicode code chart the HEBREW LIGATURE YIDDISH DOUBLE VAV appears in position U+05F0, the HEBREW LIGATURE YIDDISH VAV YOD at U+05F1, and the HEBREW LIGATURE YIDDISH DOUBLE YOD at U+05F2 (where the "U+" indicates that the numerical position of the character in the Unicode chart is given by following four hexadecimal digits).

These ligatures are, however, frequently missing from Hebrew keyboards — a characteristic inherited from the similarly differentiated Yiddish and Hebrew typewriter layouts. A separate vov yud was, however, not provided on either. Hebrew typewriters were modified specifically for Yiddish by the replacement of the first two keys in the second row, which were used for punctuation marks, with one shifting key for "tsvey yudn/tsvey vovn" and another for "komets alef/pey" (with dagesh). This can be seen on a typewriter that belonged to the Yiddish author Isaac Bashevis Singer . Typewriters built directly for Yiddish include the same four additional characters in different positions, as can be seen on another typewriter that belonged to Singer . The salient difference between the two designs is that each key on the Yiddish typewriter produces one character only, available in two different sizes through shifting.

As a result of the widespread practice of writing Yiddish on Hebrew keyboards and other legacy effects of the variant digraph forms on both modified Hebrew and native Yiddish typewriters, when Yiddish text is entered from a computer keyboard with single-key digraphs, many people nonetheless type the digraphs as two-key combinations, giving the corresponding two-letter sequences (tsvey vovn U+05D5 U+05D5; vov yud U+05D5 U+05D9; tsvey yudn U+05D9 U+05D9). Although ligatures can be appropriate in monospaced typewritten text, other than in the smallest type sizes they rarely appear in proportional typesetting, where the elements of a digraph are normally letterspaced as individual characters (illustrated in Max Weinreich's name in the facsimile text in the preceding section). It may be of further interest to note that a useful, albeit highly colloquial, test of whether digraphs are regarded as single or double characters is provided by the way they appear in crossword puzzles. In Yiddish, each element of a digraph is written in its own square (and the same practice applies to other word games where letters are allocated to positions of fixed width in a regular array).

The pointed digraph pasekh tsvey yudn can also be typed in different ways. The one is simply to enter a precomposed pasekh tsvey yudn, which is both displayed and stored as a single character ײַ (U+FB1F). The second option is to enter the tsvey yudn ligature as a base character and then to enter a combining pasekh for display together with it. Although appearing to be a single character ײַ, it is stored digitally as two separate characters (U+05F2 U+05B7). These two forms can only be directly entered from a keyboard on which the ligature appears. As a result, a practice is developing where pasekh tsvey yudn are indicated by enclosing a pasekh between the elements of a two-character digraph. The pasekh aligns correctly only with the first yud (subject to conditions described in the next section) but the display is tolerably that of a fully marked digraph יַי and in some display environments may be indistinguishable from one or both of the previous alternatives. However, this option requires the storage of three separate characters (U+05D9 U+05B7 U+05D9). As a fourth alternative, albeit the least stable typographically, the second of two consecutive yudn may be pointed ייַ (U+05D9 U+05D9 U+05B7). A pasekh yud is otherwise not part of any established Yiddish character repertoire, and its use in this context manifests conditions that are specific to computerized typography. The four possible representations of the pasekh tsvey yudn thus have even greater potential for causing confusion than do the other digraphs. A further potentially confusing option specific to computerized text production, but not a component of any Yiddish orthographic tradition, is the combination of a khirik with a tsvey yudn ligature to represent the consonant-vowel sequence yud — khirik yud, as ײִ (U+05F2 U+05B4) rather than the correct ייִ (U+05D9 U+05D9 U+05B4).

Combining marks
Fonts that support Hebrew script do not always correctly render the combining points that are specific to Yiddish (and in many cases have general difficulty with Hebrew marks). Some applications display extraneous blank space adjacent to a letter with such a mark, and the mark may be displayed in that space rather than properly positioned with the base character. Writing text for presentation in a reading environment that has unknown font resources  — as will almost invariably be the case with HTML documents — thus needs special care. Here again, this is not simply a matter of typographic preference. The disjunction of combining and base characters can easily lead to error when character sequences are copied from one application into another.

The same alternative modes of entry that are illustrated above with the pasekh tsvey yudn are available for all of the other pointed characters used in Yiddish, with largely indistinguishable visual results but with differing internal representations. Any such character that appears on either a physical or a virtual keyboard will normally be recorded as a two-character sequence consisting of the base character followed by the combining mark. If a graphic character selector is used that does not emulate a keyboard, the desired character will be chosen from a table on the basis of its appearance. Since such facilities display combining marks separately from base characters, it is likely that the precomposed character form of a character will be the more readily recognized of the alternatives.

Most applications will accept either form of input, but frequently normalize it to the combining characters. There are, however, some applications that normalize all input to precomposed characters. Digital texts containing the combining, and the precomposed alternatives are therefore both encountered. An example of extensive text using precomposed characters is provided by the online edition of the periodical לעבּנס־פֿראַגן (lebns-fragn – "Life Questions").

The present article was written using combining characters with the exception of the second row in the following table, which is provided to illustrate the differences between the two forms. In a viewing environment prone to the misalignment of base characters with their combining marks, precomposed characters are more likely to be typographically stable (but may cause greater difficulty in other regards).

Punctuation
The punctuation marks used to indicate sentence structure — the comma, period, colon, and semicolon — are the same in Yiddish as they are in English. The punctuation used for the abbreviation, contraction, and concatenation of words — the apostrophe and hyphen — are conceptually similar but typographically distinct in a manner that, yet again, can cause confusion when represented digitally. (The APOSTROPHE is U+0027, and the HEBREW PUNCTUATION GERESH is U+05F3.) What is termed a double apostrophe is used to indicate abbreviation through the removal of several consecutive letters. For example,  (doktor = "doctor") is abbreviated  (equivalent to "Dr."). The punctuation mark is, however, not the QUOTATION MARK (U+0022), but the HEBREW PUNCTUATION GERSHAYIM (U+05F4), which is the dual form of the word geresh.

Yiddish words are also hyphenated in a manner that is directly comparable to English punctuation. The character used to indicate it is, however, not the HYPHEN-MINUS (U+002D), but the HEBREW PUNCTUATION MAQAF (U+05BE). Typeset text may also indicate hyphenation with a character resembling an equal sign (⸗), sometimes in an oblique variant, but this is uncommon in digital text.

The distinctions between geresh – gershayim – maqaf and "apostrophe – quotation mark – hyphen" are always indicated correctly in typeset material (with exception for the occasional deliberate use of the hyphen instead of the maqaf). All characters in the first group are, however, not directly available on many Hebrew or Yiddish keyboards, and any that is lacking is commonly replaced by the corresponding character in the second group. Here again, in situations that depend on the correct matching of character sequences, the fall-back representation of a punctuation mark may not match the stored target of a database query, without the reason for the failure being apparent to a non-specialist user.

Paired characters such as parentheses, brackets, and quotation marks, which are typographically mirrored  —  ( )   [ ]   { }   “ ”  —  are prone to incorrect presentation in digital Yiddish text, with the opening and closing forms appearing to have exchanged places. (There are several instances in the preceding text where this problem will be apparent on systems that do not properly render mirroring characters in bidirectional text.)

See also
 Yiddish dialects
 Yiddish phonology
 Hebrew punctuation

Notes

References 
Birnbaum, Salomo A., Praktische Grammatik der Jiddischen Sprache für den Selbstunterricht, Hartleben Verlag, Vienna, 1918, (in German), 5th ed., Grammatik der Jiddischen Sprache, mit einem Wörterbuch und Lesestücken, Buske Verlag, Hamburg, 1988, .
Birnbaum, Solomon A., Yiddish: A Survey and a Grammar, University of Toronto Press, Toronto, 1979, .
Estraikh, Gennady, Soviet Yiddish: Language Planning and Linguistic Development, Clarendon Press, Oxford, 1999, .
Fishman, Joshua A. (ed.), Never Say Die: A Thousand Years of Yiddish in Jewish Life and Letters, Mouton Publishers, The Hague, 1981, (in English and Yiddish), .
Frakes, Jerold C., The Cultural Study of Yiddish in Early Modern Europe, Palgrave Macmillan, New York, 2007, .
Frakes, Jerold C., Early Yiddish Texts 1100-1750, Oxford University Press, Oxford, 2004, .
Frank, Herman, Jewish Typography and Bookmaking Art, Hebrew-American Typographical Union, New York, 1938.
Harkavy, Alexander, Harkavy's English-Jewish and Jewish-English Dictionary, Hebrew Publishing Company, New York, 1898. Expanded 6th ed., 1910. scanned facsimile
Harkavy, Alexander, Yiddish-English-Hebrew Dictionary, Hebrew Publishing Company, New York, 1925. Expanded 2nd ed., 1928, reprinted, Yale University Press, 2005, .
Herzog, Marvin, et al. (ed.), YIVO, The Language and Culture Atlas of Ashkenazic Jewry, 3 vols., Max Niemeyer Verlag, Tübingen, 1992–2000, .
Jacobs, Neil G., Yiddish: A Linguistic Introduction, Cambridge University Press, Cambridge, 2005, .
Katz, Dovid, Grammar of the Yiddish Language, Duckworth, London, 1987, . scanned facsimile
Katz, Dovid (compiler), Code of Yiddish Spelling, Oxforder Yidish Press, Oxford, 1992, (in Yiddish), . scanned facsimile
Niborski, Yitskhok, Verterbukh fun loshn-koydesh-stamike verter in yidish, 3rd ed., Bibliothèque Medem, Paris, 2012, .
Schaechter, Mordkhe, The Standardized Yiddish Orthography: Rules of Yiddish Spelling, 6th ed., and The History of the Standardized Yiddish Spelling, YIVO Institute for Jewish Research, New York, 1999, (in Yiddish with introductory material in English), .
Weinreich, Max, Proyektn fun an aynheytlekher yidishen oysleyg, in Der aynhaytlekher Yidisher oysleyg: materialn un proyektn tsu der ortografisher konferents fun YIVO, ershte zamlung, Yidisher Visnshaftlekher Institut, Vilna, 1930. pp. 20–65 scanned facsimile
Weinreich, Uriel, Modern Yiddish-English English-Yiddish Dictionary, YIVO Institute for Jewish Research, New York, 1968, .
Weinreich, Uriel, College Yiddish: an Introduction to the Yiddish language and to Jewish Life and Culture, 6th revised ed., YIVO Institute for Jewish Research, New York, 1999, .
Yardeni, Ada, The Book of Hebrew Script, The British Library, London, 2002, .
YIVO, Der aynhaytlekher Yidisher oysleyg: materialn un proyektn tsu der ortografisher konferents fun YIVO, ershte zamlung, Yidisher Visnshaftlekher Institut, Vilna, 1930. scanned facsimile
YIVO, Oysleyg-takones fun Yidish, Yidisher Visnshaftlekher Institut, Vilna, 1935. scanned facsimile

External links 

Yiddish-English/English-Yiddish Dictionary – by Alexander Harkavy; also includes his Treatise on Yiddish Reading, Orthography, and Dialectal Variations
Ezra SIL – a freely available font designed for heavily marked Hebrew script
Yiddish Typewriter – online interconversion of Hebrew script and YIVO transliteration

Orthography
Typography
Orthographies by language
Scripts with ISO 15924 four-letter codes